Jillian Ward (born Jhyllianne Wardë; February 23, 2005) is a Filipino actress, singer, and vlogger. She is known for playing the title role of Gertrudis "Trudis" Capili-Ferrer in GMA Network's Sine Novela, Trudis Liit, Donna Marie "Mayi" Madreal-Escalante in the afternoon drama, Prima Donnas, and Dra. Analyn Santos in the afternoon medical drama, Abot-Kamay na Pangarap.

Life and career
Jillian Ward was born as Jhyllianne Wardë on February 23, 2005, in Manila, Philippines, to Elson Penzon and Jennifer Wardë-Penzon. She first appeared in a commercial for Promil. Before starring in GMA Network's TV remake of the classic film Trudis Liit, she had played the role of Daldanika in The Last Prince.

In November 2019, Ward founded her own business, Wonder Tea Philippines, which was opened in Floridablanca as its first branch. It was followed by Guagua, San Fernando and Porac as their second, third  and fourth branches.

In August 2020, Ward published her first YouTube vlog titled "MY SECOND HOUSE' CONSTRUCTION TOUR" featuring her 3-storey home in Pampanga.

On February 25, 2023, Ward wore her dark blue galaxy-inspired gown designed by Mak Tumang during her Debut, which was held at Okada Manila.

Filmography

Film

Television

Discography

Singles

Music Video Appearances

Awards

References

External links

Sparkle GMA Artist Center profile

2005 births
Living people
People from Manila
Actresses from Manila
GMA Network personalities
Filipino child actresses
Filipino child singers
Filipino television actresses
Filipino film actresses
Filipino people of American descent
Tagalog people